Norihisa (written: ,  or ) is a masculine Japanese given name. Notable people with the name include:

, Japanese politician
, Japanese footballer
, Japanese politician

Japanese masculine given names